Kanyadanam is a 1998 Telugu-language drama film starring Srikanth, Upendra and Rachana Banerjee, directed by E. V. V. Satyanarayana and produced by Ambica Krishna. The film's music was composed by Koti. The film released on 10 July 1998 across Andhra Pradesh.

Synopsis
The movie revolves around some bachelors who come into the city to find work. Upendra and Rachana fall for each other at their first encounter. But Rachana later marries Srikanth. When Srikanth learns that his wife has actually loves Upendra, he arranges a marriage for both of them. The movie has a good blend of comedy scenes with Brahmanandam, situational background score and a nice story line. The movie has depicted the lover-boy role of Upendra, despite his eccentric image.

Cast
 Srikanth as Niwas
 Upendra as Venkat 
 Rachana as Vandana
 Sivaji
 Rajeev Kanakala
 Varsha

Production
Kanyadanam was Upendra's debut movie in Telugu along with Srikanth. The film explored the soft and romantic side of Srikanth and Upendra.

Box office
Kanyadanam was a box office success and was one among the hit Telugu films of 1998.

Soundtrack
The film's music was composed by Koti.

References

1990s Telugu-language films
Films directed by E. V. V. Satyanarayana
Films scored by Koti